In computational learning theory, let C be a concept class over a domain X and c be a concept in C. A subset S of X is a witness set for c in C if c(S) verifies c (i.e., c is the only consistent concept with respect to c(S)). The value  is called the teaching dimension of C.

Computational learning theory